Fibuloides is a genus of moths belonging to the family Tortricidae.

Species
Fibuloides aestuosa (Meyrick, 1912)
Fibuloides biuncana (Kuznetzov, 1997)
Fibuloides corinthia (Meyrick, 1912)
Fibuloides crocoptila (Diakonoff, 1968)
Fibuloides cyanopsis (Meyrick, 1912)
Fibuloides deltostoma (Diakonoff, 1968)
Fibuloides elongata (Zhang & Li, 2005)
Fibuloides euphlebia (Kawabe, 1989)
Fibuloides japonica (Kawabe, 1978)
Fibuloides levatana (Kuznetzov, 1997)
Fibuloides macrosaris (Meyrick, 1938)
Fibuloides metaspra (Diakonoff, 1983)
Fibuloides minuta Horak, 2006
Fibuloides modificana Kuznetzov, 1997
Fibuloides munda (Diakonoff, 1983)
Fibuloides neaera (Meyrick, 1912)
Fibuloides phycitipalpiaa Horak, 2006
Fibuloides pythonias (Meyrick, 1910)
Fibuloides rusticola Razowski, 2013
Fibuloides segregana (Kuznetzov, 1997)
Fibuloides thysanota (Meyrick, 1912)
Fibuloides trapezoidea Zhang & Li, 2011
Fibuloides wuyiensis (Zhang & Li, 2005)

See also
List of Tortricidae genera

References

External links
Tortricid.net

Enarmoniini
Tortricidae genera